

Tournament records

Asian Games

Scores

2018

Classification 5–8
28 August||51|
|80

Classification 7th–8th
31 August||66|
|82

See also
 Mongolia women's national under-19 basketball team
 Mongolia women's national under-17 basketball team
 Mongolia women's national 3x3 team

References

External links
 Archived records of Mongolia team participations

 
Women's national basketball teams